Eocarterus is a genus of beetles in the family Carabidae. It contains eight species divided into two subgenera, Eocarterus and Baeticocarus.

Species

Subgenus Baeticocarus
This subgenus contains the following species:
 Eocarterus amicorum Wrase, 1993
 Eocarterus baeticus Rambur, 1837

Subgenus Eocarterus
This subgenus contains the following species:
 Eocarterus chodshenticus Ballion, 1871
 Eocarterus esau Heyden, 1885
 Eocarterus propagator Reitter, 1901
 Eocarterus semenowi (Reitter, 1893)
 Eocarterus tazekensis Antoine, 1959
 Eocarterus usgentensis Heyden, 1884

References

 
Beetles described in 1923